Bahishti Zewar ( "paradisaical jewels" ) is a volume of Deobandi beliefs and practices written by Mawlānā Ashraf Ali Thanvi. The book is comprehensive handbook of fiqh, Islamic rituals and morals, it is especially aimed at the education of girls and women. The volume describes the Five Pillars of Islam and also highlights more obscure principles. For years it has remained a favorite with the people of the Indian subcontinent as well as the Indian Muslim diaspora all over the world. It was originally written in the Urdu language but has been translated into a host of other languages including English.

Barbara Daly Metcalf's 1992 book Perfecting Women is a commentary and history of the Bahishti Zewar.

Sections
The book is divided into ten sections:
"True Stories"
"Beliefs"
"Incorrect Beliefs and Actions"
"Salat and its Virtues"
"Fasting, Zakat, Qurbâni, Hajj, Vows, Apostasy, Halâl and Harâm, etc."
"Marriage, Divorce, 'Iddah, Maintenance, Custody, the Rights of Living and Reciting the Qurân"
"Principles of Business and Pursuit of Wealth"
"Etiquette, Manners Reformation of the Heart Deeds and their Retribution, and the Signs of Qiyâmah"
"The Lives of Pious Women"
"Health Matters and Etiquette

Legacy
Perfecting Women: Maulana Ashraf Ali Thanawi's Bihishti Zewar

See also
Ashraf Ali Thanwi

References

External links
Bahishti Zewar Online
Beheshti Jeor of 11 volumes
Emdadiya's most popular book is Beheshti Jeor

Books about Islamic jurisprudence
Islam and women
Deobandi fiqh literature
20th-century Indian books
Indian non-fiction books
Indian religious texts
Islamic studies books
Islamic literature
Books by Ashraf Ali Thanwi